Sir James Power, 2nd Baronet (6 December 1800 – 30 September 1877) was an Irish Liberal and Repeal Association politician, barrister, and Governor of the Bank of Ireland.

Family
Power was the son of John Power, a whiskey distiller and head of the Powers company, and Mary (née Brennan). He married Jane Ann Eliza Talbot, daughter of John Hyacinth Talbot in 1843 and together they had six children: John; James; Thomas; Mary Jane; Gwendoline Anna Eliza; and, Francis Mary Ursula.

Political career
Power was elected Repeal Association Member of Parliament (MP) for County Wexford in the 1835 general election and held the seat until 1847 when he stood down. He was later elected MP as a Liberal candidate for the same constituency in the 1865 general election and held the seat until 1868 when he stood down.

Baronetcy
Power succeeded to the peerage in 1855 upon the death of his father. Upon his death, his son John Talbot Power succeeded.

Other activities
Power was Governor of the Bank of Ireland, Chairman of the Dublin, Wicklow and Wexford Railway, and Commissioner for Charitable Bequests in Ireland. He was also a Deputy Lieutenant. In 1859, he was High Sheriff of Dublin City.

References

External links
 

1800 births
1877 deaths
Irish Liberal Party MPs
Irish Repeal Association MPs
Members of the Parliament of the United Kingdom for County Wexford constituencies (1801–1922)
High Sheriffs of Dublin City
Baronets in the Baronetage of the United Kingdom
UK MPs 1835–1837
UK MPs 1837–1841
UK MPs 1841–1847
UK MPs 1865–1868